Viriato de Barros (born in Vila Nova Sintra in the island of Brava in Cape Verde) is a Cape Verdean writer.  He worked as a professor in Portugal, São Tomé and Príncipe, Cape Verde and in Quelimane, Mozambique, he returned during Cape Verdean independence in 1975.  Between 1975 and 1985, he was director and was responsible in Cultural Associations and Co-operation of the Ministry of Education.  He was later Cape Verdean ambassador to Senegal and later a place named Santa Sé between 1984 and 1985, he was later councillor to the President of the Republic.  In 1985, he returned to Cape Verde and was a journalist of America's Voice and was a journalist of social communications in Washington, D.C. between 1986 and 1988 and then he headed to Portugal where he had reintegrated the Portuguese public funding, newly as a professor.  He is now a member of the Scientific Council and reporter at the Multicultural Studies Centre, associated by the International University of Lisbon.

Literature
He is an author of several works:

Identidade (2001)
Para Lá de Alcatraz (2005)

External links
http://www.multiculturas.com/viriato_barros.htm

Year of birth missing (living people)
Living people
Cape Verdean male writers
People from Brava, Cape Verde